Old Ford Lock is a lock on the Regent's Canal, between Globe Town and Old Ford in the London Borough of Tower Hamlets.

The associated lock cottage, and stables were designated Grade II listed buildings in 1990. Thames lighters using the canal would have horses provided by the operators of the canal. Horses would be changed at City Road Lock - where the canal enters the Islington Tunnel; and at Camden Lock.

The lock has facilities for taking on water; and rubbish and chemical toilet waste disposal.

References

Old Ford Lock No 8 (Canalplan gazetteer entry)

Locks on the Regent's Canal
Geography of the London Borough of Tower Hamlets
Buildings and structures in the London Borough of Tower Hamlets
Bow, London